"Sail Away" is a song by the Finnish rock band The Rasmus, originally released on the band's sixth studio album Hide from the Sun on September 2, 2005. The song was written by the lead singer Lauri Ylönen. Sail away was 2nd on the United States singles list in 2005.

The music video went #1 at MTV Latino in March 2006. It has also been a popular video on many other music channels in Europe.

The single was released on October 25, 2005 by Playground Music Scandinavia. The cover of the maxi single is different from the original version. The maxi single contains the PC-program "The Rasmus Player". The image in the adjacent box is the original cover. It is the second single from the album Hide from the Sun.

"Sail Away" is a slow and melodic song with violin featured. The strings were arranged by Jesper Nordenström and performed by Jakob Ruthberg, Anna S Wallgren, Roland Kress and Christian Bergqvist.

Single track listing
CD-single
"Sail Away" – 3:48
"Sail Away" (Benztown Mixdown) – 5:34

Maxi single
"Sail Away" – 3:48
"Sail Away" [acoustic]
"Sail Away" (Benztown Chillout Remix)
"Lucifer's Angel" – 4:01
"The Rasmus Software Player:
Sail away - music video
Photo Gallery From the making of the video in Latvia.
Extra video material

Music video

The music video to "Sail Away" was shot on a beach in Riga, Latvia on 19th & 20 September  2005. It was directed by the young Berlin team Mathias Vielsäcker and Christoph Mangler.

In the video, some black butterflies fly away to the sea after singer Lauri Ylönen is shown walking slowly down a cold-looking beach, singing. He sees a man coming up onto the shore carrying an empty bird-cage and he carries on walking. He sees another man, digging a grave, and a woman (supposedly his wife) standing near him. The woman takes some pills, probably to commit suicide and jerks her head in Ylönen's direction. Ylönen keeps walking, finds a crow's feather on the sand in front of him, and picks it up. As he is walking, he sees some more odd happenings, such as two children dancing around a wooden sculpture (possibly a pyre) in gas masks. The pyre has dolls in coffins hung on it. Ylönen enters a shack as a sand-storm approaches the shore. There, he finds the rest of the band playing the song. He waits a few seconds and after the storm reaches the shack, he resumes playing. Aki Hakala (drummer) and Eero Heinonen (bassist) both turn into sand-figures. At the end of the video, Hakala's head and Heinonen's arms both fall off.

Charts

Weekly charts

Year-end charts

References

2005 singles
The Rasmus songs
Songs written by Lauri Ylönen
Rock ballads
2005 songs
Playground Music Scandinavia singles